Kaahumanu (March 17, 1768 – June 5, 1832) ("the feathered mantle") was queen consort and acted as regent of the Kingdom of Hawaii as Kuhina Nui. She was the favorite wife of King Kamehameha I and also the most politically powerful, and continued to wield considerable power as co-ruler in the kingdom during reigns of his first two successors.

Early life
Kaahumanu was born in a cave called Puu Kauiki in Hāna on the Hawaiian island of Maui. She was born on 17 March 1768. The present Kaahumanu Society celebrates the birthday of its namesake on March 17.
Her father was Keʻeaumoku Papaʻiahiahi, a fugitive alii (noble) from the island of Hawaii, and her mother was Nāmāhānaikaleleokalani, the wife of her half-brother the late king of Maui, Kamehameha Nui. Through her mother she was related to many kings of Maui. Through her father, she was the third cousin of Kamehameha I, both sharing the common ancestor, Princess Kalanikauleleiaiwi of the island of Hawaii. She was named after her father's rival, Kahekilinuiahumanu because it was from him that her father was fleeing at the time.

Her siblings include Governor John Adams Kuakini of Hawaii island, Queen Kalākua Kaheiheimālie, and Governor George Keeaumoku II of Maui.
Her father became an advisor and friend to Kamehameha I, eventually becoming royal governor of Maui. He arranged for Kaahumanu to marry him when she was thirteen. Kamehameha had numerous wives but Kaahumanu would become a favorite and encouraged his war to unify the islands.

Queen Regent
Kaahumanu was one of Kamehameha I's favorite wives and his most powerful. Upon Kamehameha's death on May 8, 1819, Kaahumanu announced that late king had wished that she share governance over the Kingdom of Hawaii with his 22-year-old son Liholiho, who took the name of Kamehameha II. The council of advisors agreed and created the post of kuhina nui for her, which was similar to co-regent or modern-day prime minister. Her power base grew and she ruled as Queen Regent during the reigns of both Kamehameha II and Kauikeaouli, who assumed the throne as Kamehameha III.

In some ways Kaahumanu was ahead of her time and championed the rights of native Hawaiian women, although this was to her own advantage. In what became known as the 'Ai Noa (free eating), Kaahumanu conspired with Keōpūolani, another of her late husband's wives who was also a Queen Regent during the reign of Kamehameha II, to eat at the same table with the young king. Notably, she also convinced the Kahuna-nui (translatable to High Priest) of the kingdom, Hewahewa, to support her efforts to abolish the kapu. Breaking a major kapu which should have resulted in her death, but her son refused to kill her; this event effectively broke the monarchy's support of the kapu, and resulted in the system being outlawed.

Kaumualii of Kauai
The island of Kauai and its subject island Niihau had never been forcibly conquered by Kamehameha. After years of resistance they negotiated a bloodless surrender in the face of Kamehameha's armada. In 1810 the island's King, Kaumualii, became a vassal to Kamehameha. When Kamehameha I died, Kamehameha II and Kaahumanu feared Kauai would break away from the kingdom. To preserve the union they kidnapped Kaumualii on October 9, 1821, and Kaahumanu married him by force. After Kaumualii died in 1824, and a rebellion by Kaumualii's son Humehume was put down, she married his other son Kealiiahonui.

Embracing Christianity
In April 1824, Kaahumanu publicly acknowledged her embrace of Protestant Christianity and encouraged her subjects to be baptized into the faith. That same year, she presented Hawaii with its first codified body of laws modeled after Christian ethics and values and the Ten Commandments. Kaahumanu was baptized on December 5, 1825, at the site where Kawaiahao Church stands today. She took the name "Elizabeth".

Missionaries persuaded Kaahumanu that the Roman Catholic Church, which had established the Cathedral of Our Lady of Peace in Honolulu, should be removed from the island nation. On July 7, 1827, she ordered the first Catholic missionaries to leave. In 1830, Kaahumanu signed legislation that forbade Catholic teachings and threatened to deport whoever broke the law.

In 1832, Kaahumanu visited Maui, and came to the site of what is now Kaahumanu Church, witnessing services being presided by Jonathan Smith Green. Upon seeing this, Queen Ka'ahumanu asked the Congregationalist mission to name the permanent church structure after her. However, this request was not honored until 1876 when Edward Bailey constructed the fourth and current structure on the site, naming it after the Queen.

Banning Hula 
As regent of Hawai'i after the death of her husband, King Kamehameha I, Ka'ahumanu took it upon herself to enforce Christian policies with her power, banning of the Hawaiian Dance hula in 1830. After her death in 1832, some chiefs ignored this ban, including King Kamehameha III. However it was not until King Kalakaua's reign in 1886 that hula was celebrated openly once again, quote "Hula is the language of the heart and therefore the heartbeat of the Hawaiian people." Ka'ahumanu's policies on hula have had a ripple effect on the acceptability of the art form ever since.

Establishing American relations
Kaahumanu and King Kamehameha III negotiated the first treaty between the Kingdom of Hawaii and the United States in 1826, under the administration of President John Quincy Adams. The treaty assumed responsibility on behalf of native Hawaiians with debts to American traders and paid the bill with $150,000 worth of sandalwood; this won her the support of chiefs who owed money to the traders. The same document was also a free trade treaty, ensuring Americans had the right to enter all ports of Hawaii to do business. Americans were also afforded the right to sue in Hawaiian courts and be protected by Hawaiian laws.

In 1827, after Kaahumanu returned from a tour of the windward islands, her health steadily declined. During her illness missionaries printed the first copy, bound in red leather with her name engraved in gold letters, of the New Testament in the Hawaiian language. She kept it with her until her death of intestinal illness, June 5, 1832, in the Mānoa Valley near Honolulu. Her funeral was held at Kawaiahao Church, often referred to as the Westminster Abbey of Hawaii. Services were presided by Hiram Bingham. She was laid to rest on Iolani Palace grounds but was later moved to the Royal Mausoleum. The monument of Kaumualii in Waiola Church cemetery includes the inscription, "Kaahumanu was his wife, Year 1822," leading some to mistakenly conclude that she is buried there.

Notes 
A portion of the Hawaii Belt Road, state highway 19, on the Big Island of Hawaiʻi is named in her honor. It connects the towns of Kailua-Kona and Kawaihae.
Often referred to by locals as "the Queen K," it is used for the bicycle and running portions of the Ironman World Championship Triathlon. It also provides access to the Kona International Airport.

Queen Kaʻahumanu Center shopping mall is located at 275 West Kaʻahumanu Avenue (Hawai state route 32) in Kahului, Maui, .

Kaʻahumanu Society, a Hawaiian civics club, was founded and named in her honor in 1864 to celebrate her legacy, serve the poor and sick and promote the importance of Hawaiian female leadership.

Ancestry

References

Further reading

External links

Ka‘Ahumanu

1768 births
1832 deaths
19th-century women rulers
Burials in Hawaii
Converts to Protestantism from pagan religions
Hawaiian Kingdom Protestants
Hawaiian royal consorts
House of Kamehameha
House of Kekaulike
Kuhina Nui
Native Hawaiian women in politics
Royalty of the Hawaiian Kingdom
Royalty of Maui
Regents of the Hawaiian Kingdom
Remarried royal consorts
Burials at Waiola Church
Queen mothers